Darleen A. Druyun (born November 7, 1947) is a former United States Department of the Air Force civilian official, Boeing executive, and convicted felon. In 2004, Druyun pleaded guilty to a felony in relation to her role in the United States Air Force tanker contract controversy, for engaging in corruption while serving as Principal Deputy Undersecretary of the Air Force for Acquisition.

Education
Druyun graduated from Chaminade University of Honolulu and the executive education program at Harvard Kennedy School at Harvard University.

Appointments and career
From 1991 to 1993, Druyun was at NASA as head of procurement and chief of staff to Administrator Dan Goldin.

From 1993 she was Principal Deputy Undersecretary of the Air Force for Acquisition, nominated by Bill Clinton.

From 1995 Druyun introduced changes to Air Force acquisition processes, including an alternative dispute resolution process. The "lightning bolt" changes reduced the cost of the Joint Direct Attack Munition (JDAM) program. Druyun was credited with saving the F-22 Raptor procurement.

McDonnell Douglas investigation
In 1993 Druyun was investigated for her involvement in a plan to speed up payments by the Air Force to McDonnell Douglas, for the C-17 airlifter program. Although dozens of other people involved were convicted or discharged, Druyun kept her position. 

In 2000 Druyun sent the resumes of her daughter, a recent college graduate, and her daughter's fiancé, a published PhD Aeronautical Engineer, to Boeing, which had merged with McDonnell Douglas in 1997, and both were hired.

U.S. Air Force tanker contract controversy

In May 2003, the United States Air Force announced it would lease 100 KC-767 tankers to replace the oldest 136 of its KC-135s. The 10-year lease would give the USAF the option to purchase the aircraft at the end of the contract. In September 2003, responding to critics who argued the lease was vastly more expensive than an outright purchase, the United States Department of Defense announced a revised lease. In November 2003, the Air Force decided it would lease 20 KC-767 aircraft and purchase 80 tankers.

After leaving the Air Force in 2003, Druyun took a job with Boeing at an annual salary of $250,000. She also received a $50,000 signing bonus.

In December 2003, the Pentagon announced the project was to be frozen while an investigation of allegations of corruption by Druyun was begun.  Druyun pleaded guilty to inflating the price of the contract to favor her future employer and to passing information on the competing Airbus A330 MRTT bid (from EADS). CBS News called it "the biggest Pentagon scandal in 20 years" and said she pleaded guilty to a felony.

In October 2004, Druyun was sentenced to nine months in federal prison for corruption, fined $5,000, given three years of supervised release, and 150 hours of community service. She began her prison term on January 5, 2005 as inmate number 47614-083. She was released from prison on September 30, 2005.

The scandal led to the firing of Boeing CFO Michael M. Sears and the resignation of Boeing CEO Phil Condit. On February 18, 2005, Sears was sentenced to four months in prison. Boeing ended up paying a $615 million fine for their involvement.  

According to The Federal Times, Druyun will still be receiving a federal pension.

Druyun was also found guilty in awarding the initial Small Diameter Bomb contract to Boeing.

Donald Rumsfeld stated he was told "what she did was acquire a great deal of authority and make a lot of decisions, and there was very little adult supervision".

References

External links
Mini-biography of Darleen Druyun
Plea agreement

1947 births
Chaminade University of Honolulu alumni
Harvard Kennedy School alumni
Boeing people
Living people
Clinton administration personnel
American government officials convicted of crimes
United States Air Force civilians
Prisoners and detainees of the United States federal government
21st-century American criminals